St. Vincent's Hospital, Athy is a hospital located in Athy, Ireland.

History
Athy workhouse was established on the site under the Irish Poor Laws; it opened on 9 January 1844, just before the Great Famine. The Sisters of Mercy arrived as nursing sisters in 1873. In 1898, it became a County Home. 268 residents were transferred to the new St. Vincent's Hospital on 3 April 1969.

Services
At present St. Vincent's primarily provides geriatric care, including a residential care centre and day-care facilities for Alzheimer's patients. It is monitored by the Health Information and Quality Authority (HIQA).

References

Hospital
Buildings and structures in County Kildare
Hospitals in County Kildare
Hospital buildings completed in 1969
Hospitals established in 1969
1969 establishments in Ireland
Health Service Executive hospitals
20th-century architecture in the Republic of Ireland